Dundee Shipbuilders Company was a Scottish shipbuilding company, renowned for building the RRS Discovery (1901). See http://www.gracesguide.co.uk/Dundee_Shipbuilding_Co

Defunct shipbuilding companies of Scotland
Companies based in Dundee